Paweł Kotla (born 5 June 1972) is a Polish conductor.

Life and career
Paweł Kotla was born in Szczecin, the son of Ryszard Kotla. He studied at Fryderyk Chopin University of Music for symphony and opera conducting with Boguslaw Madey, and at Oxford University for musicology and performance practice with Edward Higginbottom and Andrew Parrott.

In 1997-98, Paweł Kotla worked as the Performing Fellow at Guildhall School of Music and Drama in London and as artistic director of Oxford University Philharmonia. From 1998-2003 he worked as assistant conductor to Sir Simon Rattle; from 2001-05 as artistic director of Harpenden Choral Society and from 2005-06 as artistic director of Witold Lutosławski Symphony Orchestra of Płock (Poland). In 2004 he served as the artistic director of Redhill Sinfonia. In 2006 he was named artistic director of the Leicester Symphony Orchestra.

Kotla has worked with a number of Polish orchestras and conducted in the United Kingdom, Sweden, Germany, Czech Republic, Russia, Austria and Brazil, working with orchestras such as St. Petersburg Philharmonic, London Symphony Orchestra, Polish National Radio Symphony Orchestra in Katowice, Polish National Philharmonic in Warsaw, Poznań Philharmonic, Łódź Philharmonic, Wrocław Philharmonic, Polish Radio Orchestra, London Mozart Players, City of Birmingham Symphony Orchestra and Municipal Symphonic Orchestra of São Paulo, Brazil.

Awards
 Medal of Polish Association of Orchestras and Choirs
 Gold Honorable Medal of West-Pomeranian Griffin

External links
Paweł Kotla's official webpage; accessed 4 January 2021

1972 births
Chopin University of Music alumni
Living people
Musicians from Szczecin
Polish conductors (music)
Male conductors (music)
21st-century conductors (music)
21st-century male musicians